David B. Ruderman is the Joseph Meyerhoff Professor of Modern Jewish History at the University of Pennsylvania. From 1994 to 2014 he was the Ella Darivoff Director of Penn's Herbert D. Katz Center for Advanced Judaic Studies, where he also held a fellowship from 2017 to 2018. He was trained at the City College of New York, the Teacher's Institute of the Jewish Theological Seminary of America, and Columbia University. He earned rabbinical ordination from the Hebrew Union College-Jewish Institute of Religion in New York and his doctorate in Jewish History from The Hebrew University of Jerusalem. Prior to taking his position at the University of Pennsylvania, he held teaching positions at Yale University and the University of Maryland.

Ruderman is the author of numerous books, articles, and reviews. His monograph Jewish Enlightenment in an English Key: Anglo-Jewry's Construction of Modern Jewish Thought, received the Koret Book Award. His book, The World of a Renaissance Jew: The Life and Thought of Abraham B. Mordecai Farissol, was honored with the JWB National Book Award in Jewish History. Ruderman has been president of the American Academy for Jewish Research and is the recipient of a lifetime achievement award for his work in Jewish history from the National Foundation for Jewish Culture. In 2010 he was granted an honorary Doctor of Humane Letters, honoris causa, at HUC-JIR’s Graduation Ceremonies in New York, at which event Rabbi David Ellenson, HUC-JIR president said, Ruderman's “expertise in medieval and early modern Jewish history has influenced the international academy, the rabbinate, and the Jewish community in America.  His prolific publications and dynamic leadership represent the epitome of the academic ideal.” Among his many honors are a fellowship at the American Academy of Berlin, and an Alexander von Humboldt Research Award.

Works

Awards 
2010: National Jewish Book Award in the History category for Early Modern Jewry: A New Cultural History

References

External links
 U. Penn Faculty Page

21st-century American historians
21st-century American male writers
University of Pennsylvania faculty
University of Pennsylvania historian
Historians of Jews and Judaism
American historians of religion
Berlin Prize recipients
Living people
Jewish American writers
Year of birth missing (living people)
Hebrew Union College – Jewish Institute of Religion alumni
Hebrew University of Jerusalem alumni
City College of New York alumni
Columbia University alumni
American male non-fiction writers
21st-century American Jews